The Volcan Mountains are a mountain range of the Peninsular Ranges System, located in the East County region of San Diego County, California.

Geography

They define the western side of San Felipe Valley, with the San Felipe Hills defining the east side.

Julian and the historic Coleman gold mining district lie on the southern margin of the range.

Lake Henshaw is just to the northwest.

See also 
 Volcanic Hills (California) — also in San Diego County.

References 

Mountain ranges of San Diego County, California
Peninsular Ranges
East County (San Diego County)